Hydroxylysine (Hyl) is an amino acid with the molecular formula C6H14N2O3. It was first discovered in 1921 by Donald Van Slyke as the 5-hydroxylysine form. It arises from a post-translational hydroxy modification of lysine.  It is most widely known as a component of collagen.

It is biosynthesized from lysine via oxidation by lysyl hydroxylase enzymes.  The most common form is the (5R) stereoisomer found in collagen. However, the enzyme JMJD6 has recently been shown to be a lysyl hydroxylase which modifies an RNA splicing factor producing the (5S) stereoisomer.  Additionally, in E. coli, there has been at least one lysine N-hydroxylase enzyme identified, named IucD.

References

External links
 

Amino acids